The BMW S1000R is a naked motorcycle manufactured by BMW Motorrad since 2014. It is based upon the S1000RR superbike with which it shares its engine, gearbox, frame and suspension.

2017 update 
It is also  lighter than the previous model. It has an upgraded ABS, traction control and a new exhaust. The lighter frame and upgraded electronics are taken from the S1000RR.

Like the S1000RR, it has BMW's "Gearshift Assist Pro" quickshifter as standard, which augments its performance.

References

External links 

 

S1000R
Standard motorcycles
Motorcycles introduced in 2014